Mourad Daoudi El Ghezouani (born 27 May 1998), simply known as Mourad, is a Moroccan footballer who plays as a forward for Spanish club Burgos CF, on loan from Elche CF.

Club career
An EF Torre Pacheco youth graduate, he moved to Villarreal CF in July 2016, and made his senior debut with the C-team on 5 February of the following year, playing the last 14 minutes of a 1–0 Tercera División away win against CE Almassora.

On 18 July 2018, Mourad moved to fellow fourth division side Orihuela CF. Roughly one year later he signed for Elche CF, being assigned to the reserves also in level four.

Mourad made his first team debut for Elche on 15 December 2019, coming on as a late substitute for Josan in a 2–3 home loss against UD Las Palmas in the Segunda División. Two days later he scored his first goal for the Franjiverdes, netting the opener in a 2–0 away defeat of Gimnástica Segoviana CF for the season's Copa del Rey.

On 6 October 2020, Mourad was loaned to Segunda División B side CD Alcoyano for the 2020–21 season. The following 20 August, he returned to the club on loan for a further year.

On 1 September 2022, Mourad joined second division team Burgos CF on loan for one year.

References

External links

1998 births
Living people
Footballers from the Region of Murcia
Moroccan footballers
Spanish footballers
Association football forwards
Segunda División players
Primera Federación players
Segunda División B players
Tercera División players
Villarreal CF C players
Orihuela CF players
Elche CF Ilicitano footballers
Elche CF players
CD Alcoyano footballers
Burgos CF footballers